So You Think (foaled 10 November 2006) is a New Zealand-bred Thoroughbred racehorse, now majority owned by Coolmore Stud of Ireland. So You Think came to prominence through winning the 2009 and 2010 Cox Plates, Australia's premier weight for age race. His first Cox Plate win was at only his fifth career start. His second Cox Plate win came at just his tenth career start. He started as favourite for the 2010 Melbourne Cup but finished third, in his first race past 2,040 metres. So You Think was inducted into the Australian Racing Hall of Fame in 2019.

Background
He was bred by M J Moran & Piper Farm Ltd and foaled at the Windsor Park Stud in Cambridge, New Zealand. So You Think was purchased for $NZ110,000 at the 2008 New Zealand Bloodstock Premier Yearling Sale on behalf of Malaysian billionaire Dato Tan Chin Nam and Tunku Ahmad Yahaya and was trained by Bart Cummings.

He was sired by the Irish-bred Epsom Derby winner High Chaparral out of Triassic, a New Zealand-bred daughter of the American stallion Tights. Although officially a bay, So You Think is a dark brown horse, sometimes appearing almost black.

Southern Hemisphere horses have their official birthday on 1 August, while in the Northern Hemisphere, the date is 1 January. This leads to some confusion concerning So You Think's age. Between 1 January and 1 August 2011, he was a four-year-old by Australian reckoning, but was regarded as a five-year-old in Europe. A similar discrepancy occurred in 2012.

Racing career

2008–2010: two and three-year-old seasons in Australia
So You Think had won two of his four starts before the 2009 Cox Plate, including a Group 3 against his fellow three-year-olds, and earned a start in the Cox Plate with a solid finish for fifth in the Caulfield Guineas. There was some debate on whether the horse had achieved enough to warrant a start in the Cox Plate, but the Moonee Valley Racing Club decided that he was up to the challenge. He won the Cox Plate in convincing style, leading all the way to win by 2½ lengths in a fast time of 2:03.98. So You Think followed up his Cox Plate win with a second in the Emirates Stakes two weeks later, in his last race as a three-year-old.

2010–2011: four-year-old season in Australia 
The horse resumed racing as a four-year-old in August 2010 with a win in the Memsie Stakes, beating several of Australia's top gallopers and making him the early favourite for the 2010 Cox Plate. Group One wins in the Underwood Stakes and the Yalumba Stakes meant he started odds-on for the Cox Plate, with many people labeling him as one of the best horses to ever race in Australia. He won the 2010 Cox Plate in convincing style with Steven Arnold as jockey. A week later the horse was untroubled in winning the Group 1 Mackinnon Stakes. He came third in the 2010 Melbourne Cup behind Maluckyday and winner Americain. After the race Coolmore Stud reportedly paid A$25 million for a majority interest in So You Think deciding to race the horse in Europe and to be trained by Aidan O'Brien.

2011: five-year-old season in Europe
So You Think made his European debut in the Group 3 Mooresbridge Stakes at the Curragh Racecourse on 2 May 2011, winning by 12 lengths in a field of five. He made it two from two with victory in the Group 1 Tattersalls Gold Cup at the Curragh on 22 May. Trainer Aidan O'Brien said of his four-and-a-half-length success: "He's incredible - a different creature to what we've ever seen before." He was clear favourite in The Prince of Wales at Ascot 2011, with Willie Carson famously claiming you should 'bet your house' on him five minutes before the race. However, he was pipped by Rewilding, ridden by Frankie Dettori. Dettori was later suspended for nine days for excessive use of the whip on Rewilding. Huge bets had been placed on So You Think, with one punter putting on ninety thousand pounds on the morning of the race. He bounced back on his next outing, in the Eclipse Stakes at Sandown, winning by a half length from 2010 Derby and Arc winner Workforce.

Following an eight-week spell, So You Think resumed racing again in the Irish Champion Stakes, where he gained a half-length victory over multiple Group One winner Snow Fairy. A month later he ran fourth in the Prix de l'Arc de Triomphe behind the German filly Danedream, who won in track record time. So You Think's third run as a five-year-old was in the British Champion Stakes at Ascot on 15 October. He started the race as favourite and went to the front with 400 metres to run but finished second when the French horse Cirrus des Aigles stormed home to win a neck to neck run. He then contested the Breeders' Cup Classic, where he ran sixth in his first race on dirt.

2012: six-year-old season in Europe
Following a spell of five months, during which he became a six-year-old by Northern Hemisphere reckoning he returned to racing in the Dubai World Cup, where he came fourth in his first run on Tapeta. On his return to Europe, So You Think took the Tattersalls Gold Cup for the second time, beating Famous Name by six lengths on 27 May. In June he returned to Royal Ascot for a second attempt at the Prince of Wales's Stakes. Starting 4/5 favourite against ten opponents, he took the lead two furlongs from the finish and won by two and a quarter lengths from the Queen's colt Carlton House. So You Think was scheduled to make his final appearance in the Eclipse Stakes at Sandown on 7 May, but was withdrawn after being found to be lame two days before the race.

Race record

Stud record
So You Think serves as a shuttle stallion in both the Southern and Northern Hemispheres for Coolmore Stud.

Notable progeny

c = colt, f = filly, g = gelding''

Honours
So You Think was rated equal Champion Intermediate (Middle Distance) Turf Performer in the 2010 World Thoroughbred Rankings along with Rip Van Winkle and Cape Blanco, by the International Federation of Horse Authorities. He was also rated Champion Extended Distance Performer for his 3rd in the 2010 Melbourne Cup.

Pedigree

References

Cox Plate winners
2006 racehorse births
Racehorses bred in New Zealand
Racehorses trained in Australia
Racehorses trained in Ireland
Thoroughbred family 13-a
Australian Racing Hall of Fame horses
Australian Racing Hall of Fame
New Zealand Racing Hall of Fame horses